The 1994 Northridge earthquake was a moment  6.7, blind thrust earthquake that occurred on January 17, 1994, at 4:30:55 a.m. PST in the San Fernando Valley region of the City of Los Angeles. 
The quake had a duration of approximately 10–20 seconds, and its peak ground acceleration of 1.82 g was the highest ever instrumentally recorded in an urban area in North America. Shaking was felt as far away as San Diego, Turlock, Las Vegas, Richfield, Phoenix, and Ensenada.

Two 6.0  aftershocks followed, the first about one minute after the initial event and the second approximately 11 hours later, the strongest of several thousand aftershocks in all.  The death toll was 57, with more than 9,000 injured. In addition, property damage was estimated to be $13–50 billion (equivalent to $24–93 billion in 2021), making it among the costliest natural disasters in U.S. history.

Epicenter
Although given the name "Northridge", where the quake was believed to have been centered and substantial damage occurred, the actual epicenter was pinpointed in the neighboring community of Reseda within several days.

It occurred on a previously undiscovered fault, now named the Northridge Blind Thrust Fault (also known as the Pico Thrust Fault). Several other faults experienced minor rupture during the main shock and other ruptures occurred during large aftershocks, or triggered events.

Damage and fatalities

The Historic Egyptian Theater in Hollywood was red-tagged and closed as was the Capital Theater in Glendale due to structural damage. The exact number of fatalities is unknown, with sources estimating the number to be  60 or "over 60", to 72, where most estimates fall around 60. The "official" death toll was placed at 57; 33 people died immediately or within a few days from injuries sustained, and many died from indirect causes, such as stress-induced cardiac events. Some counts factor in related events such as a man's suicide possibly inspired by the loss of his business in the disaster.
More than 8,700 were injured including 1,600 who required hospitalization. Actress Iris Adrian died in September 1994 from complications of a broken hip she suffered in the earthquake.

Sixteen people were killed as a result of the collapse of the Northridge Meadows apartment complex. The Northridge Fashion Center and California State University, Northridge also sustained very heavy damage – most notably the collapse of parking structures. The earthquake also gained worldwide attention because of damage to the vast freeway network, which serves millions of commuters every day. The most notable was to the Santa Monica Freeway, Interstate 10, known as the busiest freeway in the United States, congesting nearby surface roads for three months while the freeway was repaired. Farther north, the Newhall Pass interchange of Interstate 5 (the Golden State Freeway) and State Route 14 (the Antelope Valley Freeway) collapsed as it had 23 years earlier in the 1971 Sylmar earthquake, even though it had been rebuilt with minor improvements to the structural components. LAPD motorcycle officer Clarence Wayne Dean died because of the collapse of the Newhall Pass interchange, falling 40 feet from the damaged connector from southbound 14 to southbound I-5. He likely did not realize until too late in the early morning darkness that the elevated roadway had collapsed. The rebuilt interchange was renamed in his honor a year later.

The stadium was vacant at the time. Although several commercial buildings also collapsed, loss of life was minimized because of the early morning hour of the quake, and because it also occurred on a federal holiday (Martin Luther King Jr. Day). Also, because of known seismic activity in California, area building codes dictate that buildings incorporate structural design intended to withstand earthquakes. However, the damage revealed that some structural specifications did not perform as intended. Because of these revelations, building codes were revised. Some structures were not red-tagged until months later because the damage was not immediately evident.

The quake produced unusually strong ground accelerations in the range of 1.0 g. Damage was also caused by fire and landslides. The Northridge earthquake was notable for hitting almost the same exact area as the  6.6 San Fernando (Sylmar) earthquake. Estimates of total damage range between $13 and $50 billion.

Most casualties and damage occurred in multi-story wood-frame buildings (such as the three-story Northridge Meadows apartment building). In particular, buildings with an unstable first floor (such as those with parking areas on the bottom) performed poorly. Numerous fires were also caused by broken gas lines from houses shifting off their foundations or unsecured water heaters tumbling. In the San Fernando Valley, several underground gas and water lines were severed, resulting in some streets experiencing simultaneous fires and floods. Damage to the system resulted in water pressure dropping to zero in some areas; this predictably affected success in fighting subsequent fires. Five days later, it was estimated that between 40,000 and 60,000 customers were still without public water service. As expected, unreinforced masonry buildings and houses on steep slopes suffered damage. However, school buildings (K-12), which are required by California law to be reinforced, in general survived fairly well.

Valley fever outbreak
An unusual effect of the Northridge earthquake was an outbreak of coccidioidomycosis (Valley fever) in Ventura County. This respiratory disease is caused by inhaling airborne spores of the fungus. The 203 cases reported, of which three resulted in fatalities, constituted roughly 10 times the normal rate in the initial eight weeks. This was the first report of such an outbreak following an earthquake, and it is believed that the spores were carried in large clouds of dust created by seismically triggered landslides. Most of the cases occurred immediately downwind of the landslides.

Facilities and infrastructure affected

Hospitals
Eleven hospitals suffered structural damage and were damaged or rendered unusable. Not only were they unable to serve their local neighborhoods, but they also had to transfer out their inpatient populations, which further increased the burden on nearby hospitals that were still operational. As a result, the state legislature passed a law requiring all hospitals in California to ensure that their acute care units and emergency rooms would be in earthquake-resistant buildings by January 1, 2005. Most were unable to meet this deadline and only managed to achieve compliance in 2008 or 2009.

Television, movie, and music productions
The production of movies and TV shows was disrupted. At the time of the quake, before dawn on Monday morning, the Warner Bros. film Murder in the First (with Christian Slater, Kevin Bacon, and Gary Oldman) was being filmed only  from the epicenter. Production came to a halt. The main courtroom set was in shambles. The building containing the set was later "red tagged" as unsafe due to the damage it sustained. The Star Trek: Deep Space Nine episode "Profit and Loss" was being filmed at the time, and actors Armin Shimerman and Edward Wiley left the Paramount Pictures lot in full Ferengi and Cardassian makeup, respectively. The season five episode of Seinfeld entitled "The Pie" was due to begin shooting on January 17 before stage sets were damaged. Also, ABC's General Hospital set at ABC Television Center suffered partial structural collapse and water damage.

All of the earthquake sequences in the Wes Craven film New Nightmare were filmed a month prior to the Northridge quake. The real quake struck only weeks before filming was completed. Subsequently, a team was sent out to film footage of the quake-damaged areas of the city. The cast and crew had initially thought that the scenes that were filmed before the real quake struck were a bit overdone, but upon viewing the footage after the earthquake, they were reportedly startled by the realism of it.

Some archives of film and entertainment programming were also affected. For example, the original 35 mm master films for the 1960s sitcom My Living Doll were destroyed.

Transportation

Portions of a number of major roads and freeways, including Interstate 10 over La Cienega Boulevard, and the interchanges of Interstate 5 with California State Route 14, 118, and Interstate 210, were closed because of structural failure or collapse. James E. Roberts was chief bridge engineer with Caltrans and was placed in charge of the seismic retrofit program for Caltrans until his death in 2006.

Rail service was briefly interrupted, with full Amtrak and expanded Metrolink service resuming in stages in the days after the quake. Interruptions to road transport caused Metrolink to experiment with service to Camarillo in February and Oxnard in April, which continues today as the Ventura County Line, and extended the Antelope Valley Line almost ten years ahead of schedule. Six new stations opened in six weeks. Metrolink leased equipment from Amtrak, San Francisco's Caltrain, and Toronto, Canada's GO Transit to handle the sudden onslaught of passengers. Amtrak ceased service in the Pasadena Subdivision following structural damage to a rail bridge in Arcadia and redirected all rail traffic through Riverside and Fullerton. All MTA bus lines operated service with detours and delays on the day of the quake. Los Angeles International Airport and other airports in the area were also shut down as a 2-hour precaution, including Burbank-Glendale-Pasadena Airport (now Hollywood Burbank Airport) and Van Nuys Airport, which is near the epicenter, where the control tower suffered from radar failure and panel collapse. The airport was reopened in stages after the quake.

California State University, Northridge
California State University, Northridge, was the closest university to the epicenter. Many campus buildings were heavily damaged and a parking structure collapsed.  Many classes were moved to temporary structures. The 1994 Northridge earthquake greatly affected the CSUN campus, damaging much of its infrastructure, and causing multiple fires and explosions throughout the campus. The magnitude 6.7 earthquake damaged several buildings as well as destroying all communications, such as telephone lines and causing computer systems to shut down. The seismic event killed two CSUN students at the Northridge Meadows Complex along with 14 other residents. The damage caused a shutdown of the campus and delayed the start of the 1994 Spring semester.

Campus damage 
All 58 buildings on campus sustained significant damage, resulting in a $406 million recovery effort (equivalent to $757 million today). In addition, the newly completed student parking structure C collapsed, and had to be demolished. The Oviatt Library experienced both interior and exterior damage, but the overall frame of the central part of the building remained stable, allowing student use to continue. In the Science Complex, Building #1 and #2 suffered fire damage while the bridges connecting buildings #3 and #4 were closed and named unstable. The Fine Arts Building and the South Library experienced internal structural damage, resulting in the demolition and replacement of both buildings.

Classes and enrollment 
The 1994 Spring semester was delayed by two weeks due to the Northridge earthquake. The campus was unable to use any of its classrooms because of the damage the buildings sustained. The campus still opened and provided students with mobile classrooms and mobile offices. CSUN President Dr. Blenda Wilson assured the rental of temporary structures to be placed in available spaces throughout the campus. An estimated $350 million (equivalent to $ million today) was used to supply the number of trailers and domes which housed classes and administration offices. Enrollment dropped by approximately 1,000 students, leaving some homeless as dormitories were closed due to damage that rendered them unsafe and which required repair.

External resources 
The seismic event led to millions of dollars worth of damage resulting in a sharp drop in student enrollment. CSUN received financial assistance for its efforts in reestablishing the damaged buildings with monetary gifts from the McCarthy Foundation, the Common Wealth Fund, and the Union Bank Foundation. In addition, the campus received a $23,000 check (equivalent to $ today) from the Los Angeles Times Valley Edition for the journalism department. CSUN also received assistance from government agencies FEMA and OES to support the recovery effort and serve the needs of the local community. UCLA and Pierce College opened their doors and allowed CSUN students to use their libraries while providing shuttle buses to and from the university.

Entertainment and sports
Universal Studios Hollywood shut down the Earthquake attraction, based on the 1974 motion picture blockbuster, Earthquake. It was closed for the second time since the Loma Prieta earthquake. Angel Stadium of Anaheim (then known as Anaheim Stadium) suffered some damage when the scoreboard fell into the seats, forcing a Mickey Thompson Entertainment Group off-road race at the ballpark to be postponed from that upcoming weekend to February 12.

Other buildings

Numerous Los Angeles museums, including the Art Deco Building in Hollywood, were closed, as were numerous city shopping malls. Gazzarri's nightclub suffered irreparable damage and had to be torn down. The city of Santa Monica suffered significant damage. Many multifamily apartment buildings in Santa Monica were yellow-tagged and red-tagged. An especially hard hit area was between Santa Monica Canyon and Saint John's Hospital, a linear corridor that suffered a significant amount of property damage. The City of Santa Monica provided assistance to landlords dealing with repairs so tenants could return home as soon as possible. In Valencia, the California Institute of the Arts experienced heavy damage, with classes relocated to a nearby Lockheed test facility for the remainder of 1994.  The Los Angeles Unified School District closed local schools throughout the area, which reopened one week later. UCLA and other local universities were also shut down. The University of Southern California suffered some structural damage to several older campus buildings, but classes were conducted as scheduled.

Aftermath

Lifestyle disruptions in the weeks following 
In the weeks following the quake, many San Fernando Valley residents had either lost their homes entirely or experienced structural damage too severe to continue living in them without making repairs. Although the vast majority of homes in the area, with the exception of a few particular neighborhoods, were relatively unaffected; many feared an aftershock to rival or exceed the severity of the first one. While a notable aftershock never came, many residents opted to stay in shelters or live with friends and family outside the area for a short time following.

While many businesses remained closed in the days following the quake, some infrastructure was not able to be rebuilt for months, even years later. The daily commute for many drivers in the weeks following was significantly lengthened, notably for those traveling between Santa Clarita and Los Angeles, and commuters on I-10 traveling to and from the Westside. Additionally, many businesses were forced to relocate or use temporary facilities in order to accommodate structural damage to their original locations or the difficulty accessing them. Some people even made temporary relocations closer to their jobs while their homes or neighborhoods were being rebuilt.

State legislative response
The Northridge earthquake led to a number of legislative changes. Due to the large amount lost by insurance companies, most insurance companies either stopped offering or severely restricted earthquake insurance in California. In response, the California Legislature created the California Earthquake Authority (CEA), which is a publicly managed but privately funded organization that offers minimal coverage. A substantial effort was also made to reinforce freeway bridges against seismic shaking, and a law requiring water heaters to be properly strapped was passed in 1995.

Engineering analysis
The analysis of the effect of Northridge earthquake on behavior of structures has been investigated by many researchers. For example, the behavior of underground walls has been evaluated for the Northridge earthquake using numerical methods. The comparison of the seismic behavior of underground braced walls with ACI 318 design method reveals that bending moment and shear force of the walls under Northridge earthquake loads were observed to reach 2.8 and 2.7 times as large as the respective allowable limits. Therefore, caution should be taken in seismic design of diaphragm walls using ACI 318 code requirements.

In popular culture
 The Northridge Earthquake was the subject of the 1995 film Epicenter U., a first-hand account of healing from the natural disaster, directed by Alexis Krasilovsky. The Earthquake Haggadah (1995) was a video excerpt from Epicenter U. narrated by Wanda Coleman. Distributed in 3/4" and VHS by the Poetry Film Workshop circa 1998. Re-released as part of the DVD Some Women Writers Kill Themselves in 2008.
 The Northridge earthquake was used as a plot device in the 2004 film A Cinderella Story. The movie is a modern retelling of the Cinderella classic starring Hilary Duff and Chad Michael Murray. In it, Duff's character, Sam Montgomery, lives in the San Fernando Valley with her father, stepmother, and two stepsisters. Her father, Hal, perishes in the quake trying to save her stepmother, setting the familiar tale in motion.
 A song about the earthquake was featured in the Animaniacs episode "A Quake, A Quake".
 Simon Harris and Daddy Freddy recorded The Big One, a song "dedicated to all the victims" that references the magnitude and events of the quake. Its glib treatment of the subject and ironically named label of release (Harris' Music of Life) has led some to believe the two didn't like Los Angeles and were, in reality, less than concerned about the event.
 The Northridge Earthquake was mentioned in the 1997 film Volcano.

See also

1987 Whittier Narrows earthquake
1992 Landers earthquake
1999 Hector Mine earthquake
2019 Ridgecrest earthquakes
List of earthquakes in 1994
List of earthquakes in California
List of earthquakes in the United States

References

External links

Southern California Earthquake Data Center
USGS Pasadena
USC Earthquake Engineering-Strong Motion Group
SAC Steel Project (Study of welded steel failures)
Helicopter Footage Filmed After The Quake
 City of Los Angeles Re-survey of the San Fernando Valley
Film "Epicenter U."
Film "Earthquake Haggadah, The"

1994
1994 in California
Disasters in Los Angeles
Geology of Los Angeles County, California
History of Los Angeles
History of the San Fernando Valley
Northridge, Los Angeles
Santa Susana Mountains
1994 earthquakes
April 1994 events in the United States
1994 natural disasters in the United States
January 1994 events in the United States
Buried rupture earthquakes